Barcelone, Parc au crépuscule is a 1904 French short black-and-white silent documentary film directed by Segundo de Chomón. The film depicts the parks of Barcelona, Spain.

See also 
 List of French films before 1910

External links 
 

1904 films
French black-and-white films
French short documentary films
French silent short films
Films directed by Segundo de Chomón
Articles containing video clips
1900s short documentary films
Films shot in Barcelona
1900s French films